Lorena may refer to:
Lorena (name), a given name
Lorena (footballer), Brazilian footballer
Lorena (singer), Spanish pop singer

In arts and entertainment
 Lorena (album), a 2007 album by Spanish singer Lorena
 "Lorena" (song), an 1856 song by Joseph Phillbrick Webster
 Lorena (telenovela), a Colombian soap opera
 Lorena (TV series), an Amazon Video documentary series

Places
 Lorena, Kansas, an unincorporated community in Butler County, Kansas, US
 Lorena, São Paulo, a municipality in Brazil
 Lorena, Texas, a city in McLennan County, Texas, US
 Masonic, California, US, alternately called Lorena
 Lorena, the Italian exonym for the French region of Lorraine
 Lorena, the Italian version of the name of the House of Lorraine that ruled this region

Other uses
 Lorena adobe stove, a type of cook stove 
 Lorena (weevil), a beetle genus in the tribe Apostasimerini

See also 
 Hurricane Lorena (disambiguation)
 Loreena, a given name
 Loren (disambiguation)